Bau Airport  is an airport serving Bau, Democratic Republic of the Congo.

References

Airports in Sud-Ubangi